Zinc finger protein 157 is a protein that in humans is encoded by the ZNF157 gene.

Function

This gene product is a likely zinc finger family transcription factor. It contains KRAB-A and KRAB-B domains that act as transcriptional repressors in related proteins, and multiple zinc finger DNA binding motifs and finger linking regions characteristic of the Kruppel family. This gene is part of a gene cluster on chromosome Xp11.23.

References

Further reading 

Human proteins